Dvor is a settlement in the Municipality of Šmartno pri Litiji in central Slovenia. The area is part of the historical region of Lower Carniola. The municipality is now included in the Central Slovenia Statistical Region.

Name
The name of the settlement was changed from Dvor to Dvor pri Bogenšperku in 1953. In 1995 the settlement of Dvor pri Bogenšperku was split into two new settlements: Dvor and Bogenšperk.

Lihtenberk Castle
Lihtenberk Castle, now a ruin, first mentioned in written documents dating to 1250, badly damaged in the 1511 Idrija earthquake, and finally demolished in the early 17th century, was located near the settlement.

References

External links
Dvor at Geopedia

Populated places in the Municipality of Šmartno pri Litiji